Dunedin High School is a high school in Dunedin, Florida, United States. It is operated by the Pinellas County School Board. The school mascot is Freddie the Falcon. The official school colors are red and white, though red and black have become the unofficial, and more popular, school colors.

Community involvement and partnerships
Parent-Teacher-Student Association (PTSA)
 School Advisory Council (SAC)
 Partnerships: Bright House Networks, Nielsen Media Research, Raytheon Company, City of Dunedin, Dunedin Chamber of Commerce
 Award-winning volunteer program

NJROTC
The Naval Junior Reserve Officer's Training Corps program provides an opportunity for cadets to learn valuable leadership skills, citizenship skills, and the value of commitment, honor and courage (the Navy's core values). Dunedin High School's NJROTC unit has been awarded the Distinguished Unit award four times in a row, from 2007-2010. This award is the highest honor any NJROTC unit can earn. DHS's NJROTC unit has also won the state Orienteering championships for Florida, 3 years in a row, from 2007–2009.

Scottish Highlander Band
The Scottish Highlander Band is one of the biggest organizations on campus and most prominent. There are several different ensembles within the program including: Marching band, concert band, jazz band, percussion ensemble, orchestra, and pipe band. All of the ensembles mentioned have won many awards.
In the 2012-2013 school year, a color guard was added to the band.

Notable alumni

 Amy Benz, former professional golfer
 Bill Cappleman, former professional NFL player for the Minnesota Vikings and Detroit Lions
 Michael "Pinball" Clemons, former professional football player and coach in the NFL and CFL
 Ron DeSantis, 46th Governor of Florida
 Brian Dopirak, former professional baseball player
 Matt Dunbar, former professional baseball player for the Miami Marlins
 Juan Garcia-Herreros, virtuoso jazz musician and composer
 Scott Hemond, former professional baseball player
 John Huston, professional golfer
 Crawford Ker, former professional football player for the Dallas Cowboys and Denver Broncos
 Kidd Kraddick, radio host of Kidd Kraddick in the Morning from 1992 to 2013
 David Nutter, television and film director
 Adam Quinn, Bagpipe virtuoso and member of Celtic band Lucid Druid
 Stacey Simmons, former professional football player for the Indianapolis Colts
 Lari White, musician and actress

References

External links

 Dunedin High School

High schools in Pinellas County, Florida
Public high schools in Florida
1961 establishments in Florida
Buildings and structures in Dunedin, Florida